Javier Avilés Cortés (born 17 August 1997), sometimes known as Avi, is a Spanish professional footballer who plays as a right winger for CD Lugo, on loan from CD Leganés.

Club career
Born in Madrid, Avilés joined CD Leganés' youth setup in 2015, after already having made his senior debut with CD Coslada. On 27 August 2016, after finishing his formation, he signed for Segunda División B side CD Atlético Baleares.

On 27 January 2017, after being rarely used, Avilés terminated his contract and signed for Tercera División side CF Pobla de Mafumet five days later. In July, he moved to fellow fourth division side Deportivo Rayo Cantabria.

On 2 February 2018, Avilés returned to Leganés and was assigned to the reserves also in the fourth tier. He made his first-team debut on 30 October, coming on as a late substitute for goalscorer Youssef En-Nesyri in a 2–2 home draw against Rayo Vallecano, for the season's Copa del Rey.

Avilés made his La Liga debut on 25 August 2019, replacing Javier Eraso late into a 0–1 home loss against Atlético Madrid. On 23 December, he renewed his contract until 2023.

Avilés scored his first goal in the main category of Spanish football on 27 June 2020, netting the equalizer in a 1–2 loss at CA Osasuna. On 18 August of the following year, he renewed his contract until 2026.

On 15 January 2022, after being rarely used in the first half of the campaign, Avilés was loaned to Portuguese Primeira Liga side C.D. Tondela until June. Back to the club for the 2022–23 season, he featured rarely before moving to CD Lugo on 25 January 2023, also in a temporary deal.

References

External links

1997 births
Living people
Footballers from Madrid
Spanish footballers
Association football wingers
La Liga players
Segunda División players
Segunda División B players
Tercera División players
Divisiones Regionales de Fútbol players
CD Atlético Baleares footballers
CF Pobla de Mafumet footballers
Deportivo Rayo Cantabria players
CD Leganés B players
CD Leganés players
CD Lugo players
Primeira Liga players
C.D. Tondela players
Spanish expatriate footballers
Spanish expatriate sportspeople in Portugal
Expatriate footballers in Portugal